Sieradz National Defence Brigade was a reserve unit of the Polish Army in the interbellum period. Stationed in Łódź, on August 30, 1939, it was moved to Wieluń. It consisted of several battalions, such as Wieluń I, Wieluń II, Kępno, Ostrzeszów, Lubliniec and Klobuck. Commanded by colonel Jerzy Grobicki, it was part of the Łódź Army and its battalions were divided between 7th and 10th Infantry Divisions.

See also
 Polish army order of battle in 1939
 Polish contribution to World War II

Brigades of Poland
Military units and formations established in 1939